Iskar Glacier is a glacier in Livingston Island, South Shetland Islands in Antarctica situated southeast of lower Huron Glacier, west-southwest of Sopot Ice Piedmont, and north of Dobrudzha and Magura Glaciers. It drains the north slopes of the Tangra Mountains between Helmet Peak to the west and Delchev Peak to the east, and flows northward into Bruix Cove between Yana Point and Rila Point.

The feature is named after the Iskar River in western Bulgaria.

Location
Bulgarian mapping in 2005 and 2009.

See also
 List of glaciers in the Antarctic
 Glaciology

Maps
 L.L. Ivanov et al. Antarctica: Livingston Island and Greenwich Island, South Shetland Islands. Scale 1:100000 topographic map. Sofia: Antarctic Place-names Commission of Bulgaria, 2005.
 L.L. Ivanov. Antarctica: Livingston Island and Greenwich, Robert, Snow and Smith Islands. Scale 1:120000 topographic map.  Troyan: Manfred Wörner Foundation, 2009.

References
 Iskar Glacier. SCAR Composite Antarctic Gazetteer.
 Bulgarian Antarctic Gazetteer. Antarctic Place-names Commission. (details in Bulgarian, basic data in English)

External links
 Iskar Glacier. Copernix satellite image

Tangra Mountains
Glaciers of Livingston Island